Andrew Paul Wolfe (born April 29, 1925) is an American former basketball player for the University of California, Berkeley from 1945–46 to 1947–48. As a sophomore in 1945–46, Wolfe led the Golden Bears in scoring at 13.4 points per game en route to the school's first-ever appearance at the NCAA Tournament Final Four. Cal lost to the eventual national champion, Oklahoma A&M, 52–35, however. During Wolfe's three-year California career he was named All-Pacific Coast Conference (PCC) every season as well as a consensus Second Team All-American as a senior. Wolfe became the first Cal player to break the 1,000-point threshold, finishing his career with 1,112 points while breaking the former school career record of 725 by nearly 400 points. His teams never finished lower than second place in the PCC South Division, winning it in 1946, and the school went 75–26 overall during that time. Cal's home crowd fans were so notoriously rowdy during Wolfe's era that he was once asked by the game's officials to get on the public-address microphone and calm them down, otherwise Cal would have to forfeit. Wolfe later said about the incident, "I didn't know if they'd listen to me or storm the court. Fortunately, they listened."

Wolfe was selected in the 1948 BAA Draft by the Philadelphia Warriors but never played professionally. He instead played AAU basketball for Stewart Chevrolet in San Francisco, California. Wolfe later earned his J.D. from the University of San Francisco School of Law, and practiced in Oakland for the rest of his life up until his retirement in the mid-2000s.

References

1925 births
Living people
All-American college men's basketball players
Amateur Athletic Union men's basketball players
American men's basketball players
Basketball players from Oakland, California
California Golden Bears men's basketball coaches 
California Golden Bears men's basketball players
California lawyers
Forwards (basketball)
Guards (basketball)
Philadelphia Warriors draft picks
Richmond High School (Richmond, California) alumni
University of San Francisco School of Law alumni